Asser (or Ascer) Thorkilsen ( 1089 – 5 May 1137), a son of Thorkil (Svend) Thrugotsen and his wife Inge, was the Bishop of Lund from 1089, and then the first Archbishop of Lund from 1104 until his death.

He died on 5 May 1137 in Lund.

References
 

11th-century Roman Catholic bishops in Denmark
12th-century Roman Catholic archbishops in Denmark
Roman Catholic archbishops of Lund
1137 deaths
Year of birth unknown